A minimum wage is the lowest remuneration that employers can legally pay their employees—the price floor below which employees may not sell their labor. Most countries had introduced minimum wage legislation by the end of the 20th century. Because minimum wages increase the cost of labor, companies often try to avoid minimum wage laws by using gig workers, by moving labor to locations with lower or nonexistent minimum wages, or by automating job functions.

The movement for minimum wages was first motivated as a way to stop the exploitation of workers in sweatshops, by employers who were thought to have unfair bargaining power over them. Over time, minimum wages came to be seen as a way to help lower-income families. Modern national laws enforcing compulsory union membership which prescribed minimum wages for their members were first passed in New Zealand in 1894. Although minimum wage laws are now in effect in many jurisdictions, differences of opinion exist about the benefits and drawbacks of a minimum wage.

Supply and demand models suggest that there may be employment losses from minimum wages; however, minimum wages can increase the efficiency of the labor market in monopsony scenarios, where individual employers have a degree of wage-setting power over the market as a whole. Supporters of the minimum wage say it increases the standard of living of workers, reduces poverty, reduces inequality, and boosts morale. In contrast, opponents of the minimum wage say it increases poverty and unemployment because some low-wage workers "will be unable to find work ... [and] will be pushed into the ranks of the unemployed".

History

Modern minimum wage laws trace their origin to the Ordinance of Labourers (1349), which was a decree by King Edward III that set a maximum wage for laborers in medieval England. King Edward III, who was a wealthy landowner, was dependent, like his lords, on serfs to work the land. In the autumn of 1348, the Black Plague reached England and decimated the population. The severe shortage of labor caused wages to soar and encouraged King Edward III to set a wage ceiling. Subsequent amendments to the ordinance, such as the Statute of Labourers (1351), increased the penalties for paying a wage above the set rates.

While the laws governing wages initially set a ceiling on compensation, they were eventually used to set a living wage. An amendment to the Statute of Labourers in 1389 effectively fixed wages to the price of food. As time passed, the Justice of the Peace, who was charged with setting the maximum wage, also began to set formal minimum wages. The practice was eventually formalized with the passage of the Act Fixing a Minimum Wage in 1604 by King James I for workers in the textile industry.

By the early 19th century, the Statutes of Labourers was repealed as the increasingly capitalistic United Kingdom embraced laissez-faire policies which disfavored regulations of wages (whether upper or lower limits). The subsequent 19th century saw significant labor unrest affect many industrial nations. As trade unions were decriminalized during the century, attempts to control wages through collective agreement were made.

It was not until the 1890s that the first modern legislative attempts to regulate minimum wages were seen in New Zealand and Australia. The movement for a minimum wage was initially focused on stopping sweatshop labor and controlling the proliferation of sweatshops in manufacturing industries. The sweatshops employed large numbers of women and young workers, paying them what were considered to be substandard wages. The sweatshop owners were thought to have unfair bargaining power over their employees, and a minimum wage was proposed as a means to make them pay fairly. Over time, the focus changed to helping people, especially families, become more self-sufficient.

In the United States, the late 19th-century ideas for favoring a minimum wage also coincided with the eugenics movement. As a consequence, some economists at the time, including Royal Meeker and Henry Rogers Seager, argued for the adoption of a minimum wage not only to support the worker, but to support their desired semi- and skilled laborers while forcing the undesired workers (including the idle, immigrants, women, racial minorities, and the disabled) out of the labor market. The result, over the longer term, would be to limit the nondesired workers' ability to earn money and have families, and thereby, remove them from the economists' ideal society.

Minimum wage laws

The first modern national minimum wages were enacted by the government recognition of unions which in turn established minimum wage policy among their members, as in New Zealand in 1894, followed by Australia in 1896 and the United Kingdom in 1909. In the United States, statutory minimum wages were first introduced nationally in 1938, and they were reintroduced and expanded in the United Kingdom in 1998. There is now legislation or binding collective bargaining regarding minimum wage in more than 90 percent of all countries. In the European Union, 21 out of 27 member states currently have national minimum wages. Other countries, such as Sweden, Finland, Denmark, Switzerland, Austria, and Italy, have no minimum wage laws, but rely on employer groups and trade unions to set minimum earnings through collective bargaining.

Minimum wage rates vary greatly across many different jurisdictions, not only in setting a particular amount of money—for example $7.25 per hour ($14,500 per year) under certain US state laws (or $2.13 for employees who receive tips, which is known as the tipped minimum wage), $11.00 in the US state of Washington, or £8.91 (for those aged 25+) in the United Kingdom—but also in terms of which pay period (for example Russia and China set monthly minimum wages) or the scope of coverage. Currently the United States federal minimum wage is $7.25 per hour. However, some states do not recognize the minimum wage law, such as Louisiana and Tennessee. Other states have minimum wages below the federal minimum wage such as Georgia and Wyoming, although the federal minimum wage is enforced in those states. Some jurisdictions allow employers to count tips given to their workers as credit towards the minimum wage levels. India was one of the first developing countries to introduce minimum wage policy in its law in 1948. However, it is rarely implemented, even by contractors of government agencies. In Mumbai, as of 2017, the minimum wage was Rs. 348/day.
India also has one of the most complicated systems with more than 1,200 minimum wage rates depending on the geographical region.

Informal minimum wages
Customs, tight labor markets, and extra-legal pressures from governments or labor unions can each produce a de facto minimum wage. So can international public opinion, by pressuring multinational companies to pay Third World workers wages usually found in more industrialized countries. The latter situation in Southeast Asia and Latin America was publicized in the 2000s, but it existed with companies in West Africa in the middle of the 20th century.

Setting minimum wage
Among the indicators that might be used to establish an initial minimum wage rate are ones that minimize the loss of jobs while preserving international competitiveness. Among these are general economic conditions as measured by real and nominal gross domestic product; inflation; labor supply and demand; wage levels, distribution and differentials; employment terms; productivity growth; labor costs; business operating costs; the number and trend of bankruptcies; economic freedom rankings; standards of living and the prevailing average wage rate.

In the business sector, concerns include the expected increased cost of doing business, threats to profitability, rising levels of unemployment (and subsequent higher government expenditure on welfare benefits raising tax rates), and the possible knock-on effects to the wages of more experienced workers who might already be earning the new statutory minimum wage, or slightly more. Among workers and their representatives, political considerations weigh in as labor leaders seek to win support by demanding the highest possible rate. Other concerns include purchasing power, inflation indexing and standardized working hours.

Economic models

Supply and demand model

According to the supply and demand model of the labor market shown in many economics textbooks, increasing the minimum wage decreases the employment of minimum-wage workers. One such textbook states:

A firm's cost is an increasing function of the wage rate. The higher the wage rate, the fewer hours an employer will demand of employees. This is because, as the wage rate rises, it becomes more expensive for firms to hire workers and so firms hire fewer workers (or hire them for fewer hours). The demand of labor curve is therefore shown as a line moving down and to the right. Since higher wages increase the quantity supplied, the supply of labor curve is upward sloping, and is shown as a line moving up and to the right. If no minimum wage is in place, wages will adjust until quantity of labor demanded is equal to quantity supplied, reaching equilibrium, where the supply and demand curves intersect. Minimum wage behaves as a classical price floor on labor. Standard theory says that, if set above the equilibrium price, more labor will be willing to be provided by workers than will be demanded by employers, creating a surplus of labor, i.e. unemployment. The economic model of markets predicts the same of other commodities (like milk and wheat, for example): Artificially raising the price of the commodity tends to cause an increase in quantity supplied and a decrease in quantity demanded. The result is a surplus of the commodity. When there is a wheat surplus, the government buys it. Since the government does not hire surplus labor, the labor surplus takes the form of unemployment, which tends to be higher with minimum wage laws than without them.

The supply and demand model implies that by mandating a price floor above the equilibrium wage, minimum wage laws will cause unemployment. This is because a greater number of people are willing to work at the higher wage while a smaller number of jobs will be available at the higher wage. Companies can be more selective in those whom they employ thus the least skilled and least experienced will typically be excluded. An imposition or increase of a minimum wage will generally only affect employment in the low-skill labor market, as the equilibrium wage is already at or below the minimum wage, whereas in higher skill labor markets the equilibrium wage is too high for a change in minimum wage to affect employment.

Monopsony

The supply and demand model predicts that raising the minimum wage helps workers whose wages are raised, and hurts people who are not hired (or lose their jobs) when companies cut back on employment. But proponents of the minimum wage hold that the situation is much more complicated than the model can account for. One complicating factor is possible monopsony in the labor market, whereby the individual employer has some market power in determining wages paid. Thus it is at least theoretically possible that the minimum wage may boost employment. Though single employer market power is unlikely to exist in most labor markets in the sense of the traditional 'company town,' asymmetric information, imperfect mobility, and the personal element of the labor transaction give some degree of wage-setting power to most firms.

Modern economic theory predicts that although an excessive minimum wage may raise unemployment as it fixes a price above most demand for labor, a minimum wage at a more reasonable level can increase employment, and enhance growth and efficiency. This is because labor markets are monopsonistic and workers persistently lack bargaining power. When poorer workers have more to spend it stimulates effective aggregate demand for goods and services.

Criticisms of the supply and demand model

The argument that a minimum wage decreases employment is based on a simple supply and demand model of the labor market. A number of economists, such as Pierangelo Garegnani, Robert L. Vienneau, and Arrigo Opocher and Ian Steedman, building on the work of Piero Sraffa, argue that that model, even given all its assumptions, is logically incoherent. Michael Anyadike-Danes and Wynne Godley argue, based on simulation results, that little of the empirical work done with the textbook model constitutes a potentially falsifiable theory, and consequently empirical evidence hardly exists for that model. Graham White argues, partially on the basis of Sraffianism, that the policy of increased labor market flexibility, including the reduction of minimum wages, does not have an "intellectually coherent" argument in economic theory.

Gary Fields, Professor of Labor Economics and Economics at Cornell University, argues that the standard textbook model for the minimum wage is ambiguous, and that the standard theoretical arguments incorrectly measure only a one-sector market. Fields says a two-sector market, where "the self-employed, service workers, and farm workers are typically excluded from minimum-wage coverage ... [and with] one sector with minimum-wage coverage and the other without it [and possible mobility between the two]," is the basis for better analysis. Through this model, Fields shows the typical theoretical argument to be ambiguous and says "the predictions derived from the textbook model definitely do not carry over to the two-sector case. Therefore, since a non-covered sector exists nearly everywhere, the predictions of the textbook model simply cannot be relied on."

An alternate view of the labor market has low-wage labor markets characterized as monopsonistic competition wherein buyers (employers) have significantly more market power than do sellers (workers). This monopsony could be a result of intentional collusion between employers, or naturalistic factors such as segmented markets, search costs, information costs, imperfect mobility and the personal element of labor markets. In such a case a simple supply and demand graph would not yield the quantity of labor clearing and the wage rate. This is because while the upward sloping aggregate labor supply would remain unchanged, instead of using the upward labor supply curve shown in a supply and demand diagram, monopsonistic employers would use a steeper upward sloping curve corresponding to marginal expenditures to yield the intersection with the supply curve resulting in a wage rate lower than would be the case under competition. Also, the amount of labor sold would also be lower than the competitive optimal allocation.

Such a case is a type of market failure and results in workers being paid less than their marginal value. Under the monopsonistic assumption, an appropriately set minimum wage could increase both wages and employment, with the optimal level being equal to the marginal product of labor. This view emphasizes the role of minimum wages as a market regulation policy akin to antitrust policies, as opposed to an illusory "free lunch" for low-wage workers.

Another reason minimum wage may not affect employment in certain industries is that the demand for the product the employees produce is highly inelastic. For example, if management is forced to increase wages, management can pass on the increase in wage to consumers in the form of higher prices. Since demand for the product is highly inelastic, consumers continue to buy the product at the higher price and so the manager is not forced to lay off workers. Economist Paul Krugman argues this explanation neglects to explain why the firm was not charging this higher price absent the minimum wage.

Three other possible reasons minimum wages do not affect employment were suggested by Alan Blinder: higher wages may reduce turnover, and hence training costs; raising the minimum wage may "render moot" the potential problem of recruiting workers at a higher wage than current workers; and minimum wage workers might represent such a small proportion of a business's cost that the increase is too small to matter. He admits that he does not know if these are correct, but argues that "the list demonstrates that one can accept the new empirical findings and still be a card-carrying economist."

Mathematical models of the minimum wage and frictional labor markets 
The following mathematical models are more quantitative in orientation, and highlight some of the difficulties in determining the impact of the minimum wage on labor market outcomes. Specifically, these models focus on labor markets with frictions.

Welfare and labor market participation 

Assume that the decision to participate in the labor market results from a trade-off between being an unemployed job seeker and not participating at all. All individuals whose expected utility outside the labor market is less than the expected utility of an unemployed person  decide to participate in the labor market. In the basic search and matching model, the expected utility of unemployed persons  and that of employed persons  are defined by:

If  represents a minimum wage that applies to all workers, this equation completely determines the equilibrium value of the labor market tightness . There are two conditions associated with the matching function:This implies that  is a decreasing function of the minimum wage , and so is the job finding rate . A hike in the minimum wage degrades the profitability of a job, so firms post fewer vacancies and the job finding rate falls off. Now let's rewrite  to be:Using the relationship between the wage and labor market tightness to eliminate the wage from the last equation gives us:

Job search effort 

In the model just presented, we found that the minimum wage always increases unemployment. This result does not necessarily hold when the search effort of workers is endogenous.

Empirical studies
Economists disagree as to the measurable impact of minimum wages in practice. This disagreement usually takes the form of competing empirical tests of the elasticities of supply and demand in labor markets and the degree to which markets differ from the efficiency that models of perfect competition predict.

Economists have done empirical studies on different aspects of the minimum wage, including:
 Employment effects, the most frequently studied aspect
 Effects on the distribution of wages and earnings among low-paid and higher-paid workers
 Effects on the distribution of incomes among low-income and higher-income families
 Effects on the skills of workers through job training and the deferring of work to acquire education
 Effects on prices and profits
 Effects on on-the-job training
Until the mid-1990s, a general consensus existed among economists, both conservative and liberal, that the minimum wage reduced employment, especially among younger and low-skill workers. In addition to the basic supply-demand intuition, there were a number of empirical studies that supported this view. For example, Gramlich (1976) found that many of the benefits went to higher income families, and that teenagers were made worse off by the unemployment associated with the minimum wage.

Brown et al. (1983) noted that time series studies to that point had found that for a 10 percent increase in the minimum wage, there was a decrease in teenage employment of 1–3 percent. However, the studies found wider variation, from 0 to over 3 percent, in their estimates for the effect on teenage unemployment (teenagers without a job and looking for one). In contrast to the simple supply and demand diagram, it was commonly found that teenagers withdrew from the labor force in response to the minimum wage, which produced the possibility of equal reductions in the supply as well as the demand for labor at a higher minimum wage and hence no impact on the unemployment rate. Using a variety of specifications of the employment and unemployment equations (using ordinary least squares vs. generalized least squares regression procedures, and linear vs. logarithmic specifications), they found that a 10 percent increase in the minimum wage caused a 1 percent decrease in teenage employment, and no change in the teenage unemployment rate. The study also found a small, but statistically significant, increase in unemployment for adults aged 20–24.

Wellington (1991) updated Brown et al.'s research with data through 1986 to provide new estimates encompassing a period when the real (i.e., inflation-adjusted) value of the minimum wage was declining, because it had not increased since 1981. She found that a 10% increase in the minimum wage decreased the absolute teenage employment by 0.6%, with no effect on the teen or young adult unemployment rates.

Some research suggests that the unemployment effects of small minimum wage increases are dominated by other factors. In Florida, where voters approved an increase in 2004, a follow-up comprehensive study after the increase confirmed a strong economy with increased employment above previous years in Florida and better than in the US as a whole. When it comes to on-the-job training, some believe the increase in wages is taken out of training expenses. A 2001 empirical study found that there is "no evidence that minimum wages reduce training, and little evidence that they tend to increase training."

The Economist wrote in December 2013: "A minimum wage, providing it is not set too high, could thus boost pay with no ill effects on jobs....America's federal minimum wage, at 38% of median income, is one of the rich world's lowest. Some studies find no harm to employment from federal or state minimum wages, others see a small one, but none finds any serious damage. ... High minimum wages, however, particularly in rigid labour markets, do appear to hit employment. France has the rich world's highest wage floor, at more than 60% of the median for adults and a far bigger fraction of the typical wage for the young. This helps explain why France also has shockingly high rates of youth unemployment: 26% for 15- to 24-year-olds."

A 2019 study in the Quarterly Journal of Economics found that minimum wage increases did not have an impact on the overall number of low-wage jobs in the five years subsequent to the wage increase. However, it did find disemployment in 'tradable' sectors, defined as those sectors most reliant on entry level or low skilled labor.

A 2018 study published by the university of California agrees with the study in the quarterly journal of economics and discusses how minimum wages actually cause fewer jobs for low skilled workers. Within the article it discusses a trade off for low to high skilled workers that when the minimum wage is increased GDP is more highly redistributed to high academia jobs.

In another study, which shared authors with the above, published in the American Economic Review found that a large and persistent increase in the minimum wage in Hungary produced some disemployment with the large majority of additional cost being passed on to consumers. The authors also found that firms began substituting capital for labor over time.

A 2013 study published in the Science direct journal agrees with the studies above as it describes that there is not a significant employment change due to increases in minimum wage. The study illustrates that there is not a-lot of national generalisability for minimum wage effects, studies done on one country often get generalised to others. Effect on employment can be low from minimum wage policies but these policies can also benefit welfare and poverty.

Card and Krueger
In 1992, the minimum wage in New Jersey increased from $4.25 to $5.05 per hour (an 18.8% increase), while in the adjacent state of Pennsylvania it remained at $4.25. David Card and Alan Krueger gathered information on fast food restaurants in New Jersey and eastern Pennsylvania in an attempt to see what effect this increase had on employment within New Jersey. A basic supply and demand model predicts that relative employment should have decreased in New Jersey. Card and Krueger surveyed employers before the April 1992 New Jersey increase, and again in November–December 1992, asking managers for data on the full-time equivalent staff level of their restaurants both times. Based on data from the employers' responses, the authors concluded that the increase in the minimum wage slightly increased employment in the New Jersey restaurants.

Card and Krueger expanded on this initial article in their 1995 book Myth and Measurement: The New Economics of the Minimum Wage. They argued that the negative employment effects of minimum wage laws are minimal if not non-existent. For example, they look at the 1992 increase in New Jersey's minimum wage, the 1988 rise in California's minimum wage, and the 1990–91 increases in the federal minimum wage. In addition to their own findings, they reanalyzed earlier studies with updated data, generally finding that the older results of a negative employment effect did not hold up in the larger datasets.

Research subsequent to Card and Krueger's work

In 1996, David Neumark and William Wascher reexamined Card and Krueger's result using administrative payroll records from a sample of large fast food restaurant chains, and reported that minimum wage increases were followed by decreases in employment. An assessment of data collected and analyzed by Neumark and Wascher did not initially contradict the Card and Krueger results, but in a later edited version they found a four percent decrease in employment, and reported that "the estimated disemployment effects in the payroll data are often statistically significant at the 5- or 10-percent level although there are some estimators and subsamples that yield insignificant—although almost always negative" employment effects. Neumark and Wascher's conclusions were subsequently rebutted in a 2000 paper by Card and Krueger. 

A 2011 paper has reconciled the difference between Card and Krueger's survey data and Neumark and Wascher's payroll-based data. The paper shows that both datasets evidence conditional employment effects that are positive for small restaurants, but are negative for large fast-food restaurants. A 2014 analysis based on panel data found that the minimum wage reduces employment among teenagers.

In 1996 and 1997, the federal minimum wage was increased from $4.25 to $5.15, thereby increasing the minimum wage by $0.90 in Pennsylvania but by just $0.10 in New Jersey; this allowed for an examination of the effects of minimum wage increases in the same area, subsequent to the 1992 change studied by Card and Krueger. A study by Hoffman and Trace found the result anticipated by traditional theory: a detrimental effect on employment.

Further application of the methodology used by Card and Krueger by other researchers yielded results similar to their original findings, across additional data sets. A 2010 study by three economists (Arindrajit Dube of the University of Massachusetts Amherst, William Lester of the University of North Carolina at Chapel Hill, and Michael Reich of the University of California, Berkeley), compared adjacent counties in different states where the minimum wage had been raised in one of the states. They analyzed employment trends for several categories of low-wage workers from 1990 to 2006 and found that increases in minimum wages had no negative effects on low-wage employment and successfully increased the income of workers in food services and retail employment, as well as the narrower category of workers in restaurants.

However, a 2011 study by Baskaya and Rubinstein of Brown University found that at the federal level, "a rise in minimum wage have [sic] an instantaneous impact on wage rates and a corresponding negative impact on employment", stating, "Minimum wage increases boost teenage wage rates and reduce teenage employment." Another 2011 study by Sen, Rybczynski, and Van De Waal found that "a 10% increase in the minimum wage is significantly correlated with a 3–5% drop in teen employment." A 2012 study by Sabia, Hansen, and Burkhauser found that "minimum wage increases can have substantial adverse labor demand effects for low-skilled individuals", with the largest effects on those aged 16 to 24.

A 2013 study by Meer and West concluded that "the minimum wage reduces net job growth, primarily through its effect on job creation by expanding establishments ... most pronounced for younger workers and in industries with a higher proportion of low-wage workers." This study by Meer and West was later critiqued for its trends of assumption in the context of narrowly defined low-wage groups. The authors replied to the critiques and released additional data which addressed the criticism of their methodology, but did not resolve the issue of whether their data showed a causal relationship. 

A 2019 paper published in the Quarterly Journal of Economics by Cengiz, Dube, Lindner and Zipperer argues that the job losses found using a Meer and West type methodology "tend to be driven by an unrealistically large drop in the number of jobs at the upper tail of the wage distribution, which is unlikely to be a causal effect of the minimum wage." Another 2013 study by Suzana Laporšek of the University of Primorska, on youth unemployment in Europe claimed there was "a negative, statistically significant impact of minimum wage on youth employment." A 2013 study by labor economists Tony Fang and Carl Lin which studied minimum wages and employment in China, found that "minimum wage changes have significant adverse effects on employment in the Eastern and Central regions of China, and result in disemployment for females, young adults, and low-skilled workers".

A 2017 study found that in Seattle, increasing the minimum wage to $13 per hour lowered income of low-wage workers by $125 per month, due to the resulting reduction in hours worked, as industries made changes to make their businesses less labor intensive. The authors argue that previous research that found no negative effects on hours worked are flawed because they only look at select industries, or only look at teenagers, instead of entire economies.

Finally, a study by Overstreet in 2019 examined increases to the minimum wage in Arizona. Utilizing data spanning from 1976 to 2017, Overstreet found that a 1% increase in the minimum wage was significantly correlated with a 1.13% increase in per capita income in Arizona. This study could show that smaller increases in minimum wage may not distort labor market as significantly as larger increases experienced in other cities and states. Thus, the small increases experienced in Arizona may have actually led to a slight increase in economic growth.

In 2019, economists from Georgia Tech published a study that found a strong correlation between increases to the minimum wage and detectable harm to the financial conditions of small businesses, including a higher rate of bankruptcy, lower hiring rates, lower credit scores, and higher interest payments. The researchers noted that these small businesses were also correlated with minority ownership and minority customer bases.

In July 2019, the Congressional Budget Office published the impact on proposed national $15/hour legislation. It noted that workers who retained full employment would see a modest improvement in take home pay offset by a small decrease in working conditions and non-pecuniary benefits. However, this benefit is offset by three primary factors; the reduction in hours worked, the reduction in total employment, and the increased cost of goods and services. Those factors result in a decrease of about $33 Billion in total income and nearly 1.7–3.7 million lost jobs in the first three years (the CBO also noted this figure increases over time).

In response to an April 2016 Council of Economic Advisers (CEA) report advocating the raising of the minimum wage to deter crime, economists used data from the 1998–2016 Uniform Crime Reports (UCR), National Incident-Based Reporting System (NIBRS), and National Longitudinal Study of Youth (NLSY) to assess the impact of the minimum wage on crime. They found that increasing the minimum wage resulted in increased property crime arrests among those ages 16-to-24. They estimated that an increase of the Federal minimum wage to $15/hour would "generate criminal externality costs of nearly $2.4 billion."

Economists in Denmark, relying on a discontinuity in wage rates when a worker turns 18, found that employment fell by 33% and total hours fell by 45% when the minimum wage law was in effect.

According to the 2021 study "The Effects of Minimum Wage on Employment: New Evidences for Spain" by the Bank of Spain, the sudden increase of minimum wage in Spain in 2019 by 22% (from 860 EUR/month, to 1050 EUR/month, projected to 12 annual payments) destroyed between 98,000 and 180,000 jobs, which corresponds to between 6% and 11% of jobs remunerated at minimum wage.

A 2021 study "Reallocation Effects of the Minimum Wage" in the Quarterly Journal of Economics found that the introduction of a nationwide minimum wage in Germany (8.50 EUR/hour) caused an increase in wages without leading to a reduction in employment. However, authors found that the lack of employment responses masks some important structural shifts in the economy: the minimum wage led to a reallocation of workers from smaller to larger, from lower-paying to higher-paying and from less- to more-productive establishments. Some small businesses had to exit the market, thus leading to increment of market concentration and reduced competition among firms in the product market, which can lead to higher prices. The study also found that the reallocation of low-wage workers to higher-paying establishments came at the expense of increased commuting time, which might have left some workers worse off despite earning a higher wage.

Statistical meta-analyses
Several researchers have conducted statistical meta-analyses of the employment effects of the minimum wage. In 1995, Card and Krueger analyzed 14 earlier time-series studies on minimum wages and concluded that there was clear evidence of publication bias (in favor of studies that found a statistically significant negative employment effect). They point out that later studies, which had more data and lower standard errors, did not show the expected increase in t-statistic (almost all the studies had a t-statistic of about two, just above the level of statistical significance at the .05 level). Though a serious methodological indictment, opponents of the minimum wage largely ignored this issue; as Thomas Leonard noted, "The silence is fairly deafening."

In 2005, T.D. Stanley showed that Card and Krueger's results could signify either publication bias or the absence of a minimum wage effect. However, using a different methodology, Stanley concluded that there is evidence of publication bias and that correction of this bias shows no relationship between the minimum wage and unemployment. In 2008, Hristos Doucouliagos and T.D. Stanley conducted a similar meta-analysis of 64 U.S. studies on disemployment effects and concluded that Card and Krueger's initial claim of publication bias is still correct. Moreover, they concluded, "Once this publication selection is corrected, little or no evidence of a negative association between minimum wages and employment remains." In 2013, a meta-analysis of 16 UK studies found no significant effects on employment attributable to the minimum wage. a 2007 meta-analyses by David Neumark of 96 studies found a consistent, but not always statistically significant, negative effect on employment from increases in the minimum wage.

Debate over consequences

Minimum wage laws affect workers in most low-paid fields of employment and have usually been judged against the criterion of reducing poverty. Minimum wage laws receive less support from economists than from the general public. Despite decades of experience and economic research, debates about the costs and benefits of minimum wages continue today.

Various groups have great ideological, political, financial, and emotional investments in issues surrounding minimum wage laws. For example, agencies that administer the laws have a vested interest in showing that "their" laws do not create unemployment, as do labor unions whose members' finances are protected by minimum wage laws. On the other side of the issue, low-wage employers such as restaurants finance the Employment Policies Institute, which has released numerous studies opposing the minimum wage. The presence of these powerful groups and factors means that the debate on the issue is not always based on dispassionate analysis. Additionally, it is extraordinarily difficult to separate the effects of minimum wage from all the other variables that affect employment.

Studies have found that minimum wages have the following positive effects: 
 Improves functioning of the low-wage labor market which may be characterized by employer-side market power (monopsony).
Raises family incomes at the bottom of the income distribution, and lowers poverty.
Positive impact on small business owners and industry.
 Encourages education, resulting in better paying jobs.
 Increases incentives to take jobs, as opposed to other methods of transferring income to the poor that are not tied to employment (such as food subsidies for the poor or welfare payments for the unemployed).
 Increased job growth and creation.
 Encourages efficiency and automation of industry.
 Removes low paying jobs, forcing workers to train for, and move to, higher paying jobs.
 Increases technological development. Costly technology that increases business efficiency is more appealing as the price of labor increases.
 Encourages people to join the workforce rather than pursuing money through illegal means, e.g., selling illegal drugs

Studies have found the following negative effects:
 Minimum wage alone is not effective at alleviating poverty, and in fact produces a net increase in poverty due to disemployment effects.
 As a labor market analogue of political-economic protectionism, it excludes low cost competitors from labor markets and hampers firms in reducing wage costs during trade downturns. This generates various industrial-economic inefficiencies.
 Reduces quantity demanded of workers, either through a reduction in the number of hours worked by individuals, or through a reduction in the number of jobs.
 Wage/price spiral
 Encourages employers to replace low-skilled workers with computers, such as self-checkout machines.
 Increases property crime and misery in poor communities by decreasing legal markets of production and consumption in those communities;
 Can result in the exclusion of certain groups (ethnic, gender etc.) from the labor force.
 Is less effective than other methods (e.g. the Earned Income Tax Credit) at reducing poverty, and is more damaging to businesses than those other methods.
 Discourages further education among the poor by enticing people to enter the job market.
 Discriminates against, through pricing out, less qualified workers (including newcomers to the labor market, e.g. young workers) by keeping them from accumulating work experience and qualifications, hence potentially graduating to higher wages later.
 Slows growth in the creation of low-skilled jobs
 Results in jobs moving to other areas or countries which allow lower-cost labor.
 Results in higher long-term unemployment.
 Results in higher prices for consumers, where products and services are produced by minimum-wage workers (though non-labor costs represent a greater proportion of costs to consumers in industries like fast food and discount retail)

A widely circulated argument that the minimum wage was ineffective at reducing poverty was provided by George Stigler in 1949:
 Employment may fall more than in proportion to the wage increase, thereby reducing overall earnings;
 As uncovered sectors of the economy absorb workers released from the covered sectors, the decrease in wages in the uncovered sectors may exceed the increase in wages in the covered ones;
 The impact of the minimum wage on family income distribution may be negative unless the fewer but better jobs are allocated to members of needy families rather than to, for example, teenagers from families not in poverty;
 Forbidding employers to pay less than a legal minimum is equivalent to forbidding workers to sell their labor for less than the minimum wage. The legal restriction that employers cannot pay less than a legislated wage is equivalent to the legal restriction that workers cannot work at all in the protected sector unless they can find employers willing to hire them at that wage. That may be seen as a legal violation of human right to work in its most basic interpretation as "a right to engage in productive employment, and not to be prevented from doing so".
In 2006, the International Labour Organization (ILO) argued that the minimum wage could not be directly linked to unemployment in countries that have suffered job losses. In April 2010, the Organisation for Economic Co-operation and Development (OECD) released a report arguing that countries could alleviate teen unemployment by "lowering the cost of employing low-skilled youth" through a sub-minimum training wage. A study of U.S. states showed that businesses' annual and average payrolls grow faster and employment grew at a faster rate in states with a minimum wage. The study showed a correlation, but did not claim to prove causation.

Although strongly opposed by both the business community and the Conservative Party when introduced in the UK in 1999, the Conservatives reversed their opposition in 2000. Accounts differ as to the effects of the minimum wage. The Centre for Economic Performance found no discernible impact on employment levels from the wage increases, while the Low Pay Commission found that employers had reduced their rate of hiring and employee hours employed, and found ways to cause current workers to be more productive (especially service companies). The Institute for the Study of Labor found prices in the minimum wage sector rose significantly faster than prices in non-minimum wage sectors, in the four years following the implementation of the minimum wage. Neither trade unions nor employer organizations contest the minimum wage, although the latter had especially done so heavily until 1999.

In 2014, supporters of minimum wage cited a study that found that job creation within the United States is faster in states that raised their minimum wages. In 2014, supporters of minimum wage cited news organizations who reported the state with the highest minimum-wage garnered more job creation than the rest of the United States.

In 2014, in Seattle, Washington, liberal and progressive business owners who had supported the city's new $15 minimum wage said they might hold off on expanding their businesses and thus creating new jobs, due to the uncertain timescale of the wage increase implementation. However, subsequently at least two of the business owners quoted did expand.

With regard to the economic effects of introducing minimum wage legislation in Germany in January 2015, recent developments have shown that the feared increase in unemployment has not materialized, however, in some economic sectors and regions of the country, it came to a decline in job opportunities particularly for temporary and part-time workers, and some low-wage jobs have disappeared entirely. Because of this overall positive development, the Deutsche Bundesbank revised its opinion, and ascertained that "the impact of the introduction of the minimum wage on the total volume of work appears to be very limited in the present business cycle".

A 2019 study published in the American Journal of Preventive Medicine showed that in the United States, those states which have implemented a higher minimum wage saw a decline in the growth of suicide rates. The researchers say that for every one dollar increase, the annual suicide growth rate fell by 1.9%. The study covers all 50 states for the years 2006 to 2016.

According to a 2020 US study, the cost of 10% minimum wage increases for grocery store workers were fully passed through to consumers as 0.4% higher grocery prices. Similarly, a 2021 study which covered 10,000 McDonald's restaurants in the US found that between 2016 and 2020, the cost of 10% minimum wage increases for McDonald's workers were passed through to customers as 1.4% increases in the price of a Big Mac. This results in minimum wage workers getting a lesser increase in their "real wage" than in their nominal wage, because any goods and services they purchase made with minimum-wage labor have now increased in cost, analogous to an increase in the sales tax.

According to a 2019 review of the academic literature by Arindrajit Dube, "overall, the most up to date body of research from US, UK and other developed countries points to a very muted effect of minimum wages on employment, while significantly increasing the earnings of low paid workers."

According to a 2021 study "The Minimum Wage, EITC, and Criminal Recidivism" a minimum wage increase of $0.50 reduces the probability an ex-incarcerated individual returns to prison within 3 years by 2.15%; these reductions come mainly from recidivism of property and drug crimes.

Surveys of economists
There used to be agreement among economists that the minimum wage adversely affected employment, but that consensus shifted in the early 1990s due to new research findings. According to one 2021 assessment, "there is no consensus on the employment effects of the minimum wage."

According to a 1978 article in the American Economic Review, 90% of the economists surveyed agreed that the minimum wage increases unemployment among low-skilled workers. By 1992 the survey found 79% of economists in agreement with that statement, and by 2000, 46% were in full agreement with the statement and 28% agreed with provisos (74% total). The authors of the 2000 study also reweighted data from a 1990 sample to show that at that time 62% of academic economists agreed with the statement above, while 20% agreed with provisos and 18% disagreed. They state that the reduction on consensus on this question is "likely" due to the Card and Krueger research and subsequent debate.

A similar survey in 2006 by Robert Whaples polled PhD members of the American Economic Association (AEA). Whaples found that 47% respondents wanted the minimum wage eliminated, 38% supported an increase, 14% wanted it kept at the current level, and 1% wanted it decreased. Another survey in 2007 conducted by the University of New Hampshire Survey Center found that 73% of labor economists surveyed in the United States believed 150% of the then-current minimum wage would result in employment losses and 68% believed a mandated minimum wage would cause an increase in hiring of workers with greater skills. 31% felt that no hiring changes would result.

Surveys of labor economists have found a sharp split on the minimum wage. Fuchs et al. (1998) polled labor economists at the top 40 research universities in the United States on a variety of questions in the summer of 1996. Their 65 respondents were nearly evenly divided when asked if the minimum wage should be increased. They argued that the different policy views were not related to views on whether raising the minimum wage would reduce teen employment (the median economist said there would be a reduction of 1%), but on value differences such as income redistribution. Daniel B. Klein and Stewart Dompe conclude, on the basis of previous surveys, "the average level of support for the minimum wage is somewhat higher among labor economists than among AEA members."

In 2007, Klein and Dompe conducted a non-anonymous survey of supporters of the minimum wage who had signed the "Raise the Minimum Wage" statement published by the Economic Policy Institute. 95 of the 605 signatories responded. They found that a majority signed on the grounds that it transferred income from employers to workers, or equalized bargaining power between them in the labor market. In addition, a majority considered disemployment to be a moderate potential drawback to the increase they supported.

In 2013, a diverse group of 37 economics professors was surveyed on their view of the minimum wage's impact on employment. 34% of respondents agreed with the statement, "Raising the federal minimum wage to $9 per hour would make it noticeably harder for low-skilled workers to find employment." 32% disagreed and the remaining respondents were uncertain or had no opinion on the question. 47% agreed with the statement, "The distortionary costs of raising the federal minimum wage to $9 per hour and indexing it to inflation are sufficiently small compared with the benefits to low-skilled workers who can find employment that this would be a desirable policy", while 11% disagreed.

Alternatives
Economists and other political commentators have proposed alternatives to the minimum wage. They argue that these alternatives may address the issue of poverty better than a minimum wage, as it would benefit a broader population of low wage earners, not cause any unemployment, and distribute the costs widely rather than concentrating it on employers of low wage workers.

Basic income

A basic income (or negative income tax – NIT) is a system of social security that periodically provides each citizen with a sum of money that is sufficient to live on frugally. Supporters of the basic-income idea argue that recipients of the basic income would have considerably more bargaining power when negotiating a wage with an employer, as there would be no risk of destitution for not taking the employment. As a result, jobseekers could spend more time looking for a more appropriate or satisfying job, or they could wait until a higher-paying job appeared. Alternatively, they could spend more time increasing their skills (via education and training), which would make them more suitable for higher-paying jobs, as well as provide numerous other benefits. Experiments on Basic Income and NIT in Canada and the USA show that people spent more time studying while the program was running.

Proponents argue that a basic income that is based on a broad tax base would be more economically efficient than a minimum wage, as the minimum wage effectively imposes a high marginal tax on employers, causing losses in efficiency.

Guaranteed minimum income
A guaranteed minimum income is another proposed system of social welfare provision. It is similar to a basic income or negative income tax system, except that it is normally conditional and subject to a means test. Some proposals also stipulate a willingness to participate in the labor market, or a willingness to perform community services.

Refundable tax credit
A refundable tax credit is a mechanism whereby the tax system can reduce the tax owed by a household to below zero, and result in a net payment to the taxpayer beyond their own payments into the tax system. Examples of refundable tax credits include the earned income tax credit and the additional child tax credit in the US, and working tax credits and child tax credits in the UK. Such a system is slightly different from a negative income tax, in that the refundable tax credit is usually only paid to households that have earned at least some income. This policy is more targeted against poverty than the minimum wage, because it avoids subsidizing low-income workers who are supported by high-income households (for example, teenagers still living with their parents).

In the United States, earned income tax credit rates, also known as EITC or EIC, vary by state—some are refundable while other states do not allow a refundable tax credit. The federal EITC program has been expanded by a number of presidents including Jimmy Carter, Ronald Reagan, George H.W. Bush, and Bill Clinton. In 1986, President Reagan described the EITC as "the best anti poverty, the best pro-family, the best job creation measure to come out of Congress." The ability of the earned income tax credit to deliver larger monetary benefits to the poor workers than an increase in the minimum wage and at a lower cost to society was documented in a 2007 report by the Congressional Budget Office.

The Adam Smith Institute prefers cutting taxes on the poor and middle class instead of raising wages as an alternative to the minimum wage.

Collective bargaining
Italy, Sweden, Norway, Finland, and Denmark are developed nations where legislation stipulates no minimum wage. Instead, minimum wage standards in different sectors are set by collective bargaining.
Particularly the Scandinavian countries have very high union participation rates.

Wage subsidies 
Some economists such as Scott Sumner and Edmund Phelps advocate a wage subsidy program. A wage subsidy is a payment made by a government for work people do. It is based either on an hourly basis or by income earned. Advocates argue that the primary deficiencies of the EITC and the minimum wage are best avoided by a wage subsidy. However, the wage subsidy in the United States suffers from a lack of political support from either major political party.

Education and training

Providing education or funding apprenticeships or technical training can provide a bridge for low skilled workers to move into wages above a minimum wage. For example, Germany has adopted a state funded apprenticeship program that combines on-the-job and classroom training. Having more skills makes workers more valuable and more productive, but having a high minimum wage for low-skill jobs reduces the incentive to seek education and training. Moving some workers to higher-paying jobs will decrease the supply of workers willing to accept low-skill jobs, increasing the market wage for those low skilled jobs (assuming a stable labor market). However, in that solution the wage will still not increase above the marginal return for the role and will likely promote automation or business closure.

By country

Armenia 
The concept of the national minimum wage emerged in Armenia in 1995. Since then, it has been increasing, on average, every couple of years. The longest unchanged streak of the national minimum wage was between 1999-2003, when it was set at 5,000 AMD, and between 2015-2019 where it was set at 55,000 AMD. In November 2022, the national minimum wage was subject to the latest increase. It was set at 75,000 AMD.

Lebanon

After two years of constant financial meltdown, Lebanon as of 2021 is ranking as one of the 10 countries in the world with the lowest minimum wages because of the collapse of the local pound following the Lebanese financial crisis that started in August 2019.

The minimum monthly wage set at LBP 675,000, which valued USD 450 prior to the crisis, is barely reaching USD 30 nowadays. The currency has lost nearly 90% of its value and drove three quarters of residents into poverty.

Article 44 of the Lebanese Code of Labor states that, “the minimum pay must be sufficient to meet the essential needs of the wage-earner or salary-earner and his family,” and according to Article 46, “the minimum pay assessed shall be rectified whenever economic circumstances render such review necessary.”

Republic of Ireland

The national minimum wage was introduced in the Republic of Ireland in April 2000. Prior to this, minimum wages were set by industry-specific Joint Labour Committees. However, coverage for workers was low and the agreements were poorly enforced and moreover, those who were covered by agreements received low wages.

As of April 2000, the government introduced a national minimum wage of €5.58 per hour. The minimum wage increased regularly in the period from 2000 to 2007 and reached €8.65 per hour in July 2007. As the global economic downturn hit the country in 2008, there was no further wage increases until 2016 when the minimum wage was increased to 9.15.

Before the 2019, there existed specific categories of employees that earned sub-minimum wage rates, expressed as a percentage of the full rate of pay. Employees under the age of 18 were eligible to earn 70 per cent of the minimum wage, employees in the first year of employment were eligible to earn 80 per cent, employees in the second year of full employment were eligible to earn 90 per cent and employees in structured training during working hours were eligible to earn 75, 80 or 90 per cent depending on their level of progression. This framework has since been abolished in place of a framework based on the age of the employee.

As of 1 January 2022, the minimum wage is €10.50. Those aged 20 and over are eligible to receive 100 per cent of the minimum wage. Those under the age of 18 are eligible to receive 70 per cent of the minimum wage, those aged 18 are eligible to receive 80 per cent of the minimum wage and those aged 19 are eligible receive 90 per cent of the minimum wage.

South Korea

United States

In the United States, federal minimum wage laws had their origin with the Fair Labor Standards Act of 1938, which set the minimum wage at $0.25 per hour ($ in  dollars). It has been increased multiple times up to 2020's rate of $7.25 per hour, which was set in 2009. As of 2020, there were 29 states with a minimum wage higher than the federal minimum, as well as 40+ cities with minimum wages that exceeded state or federal minimum wages. This results in almost 90% of U.S. minimum wage workers earning more than $7.25, such that the effective nationwide minimum wage, (the wage that the average minimum wage worker earns), was $11.80 in May 2019.

Starting in 2022, if an individual is employed by a state which has laws that set the minimum wage at a higher amount, the employer must abide by the state law. For an example, the state of California has its own minimum wage laws, and it is set at $14.00/ hr, which is a one-dollar increase from 2021, an employer is not allowed to 'default' to the lower federal minimum wage of $7.25/hr. However, not all states have set state-issued (example: Alabama, South Carolina, Tennessee) minimum wage laws, in which the minimum wage defaults to the federal one. It is possible for a state to have a lower state minimum wage than the Federally mandated one, like Georgia and Wyoming. Both states have minimum wages of just over $5.00 ($5.45 and $5.15) Most workers in both Georgia and Wyoming are in fact earning the Federal minimum wage due to the 'Fair Labor Standards Act,' but there are a few exceptions. Workers can be paid under the minimum wage if they are participants in a 'Full-Time Student Program,' student learners, and individuals with disabilities. The 'Full-Time Student Program' refers to the notion which allows employers to pay students only 85% of the current minimum wage. To meet these requirements a student can only work part-time while school is in session, with a maximum of 20 hours a week. 

Employers also must strictly abide by all stated and sanctioned Child Labor Laws as dictated by the U.S. Federal government. A Student Learner is according to "section 14(a), is a student who is at least 16 years of age (or at least 18 years of age if employed in an occupation which the Secretary of Labor has declared to be particularly hazardous), who is receiving instruction in any accredited school, college or university and who is employed by an establishment on a part-time basis, pursuant to a bona fide vocational training program."[201] A Student Learner can not be paid less than 75% of the mandated minimum wage. Employers whom hire 'student learners' must submit a rigorous application and retain a certificate that clearly states the terms and conditions of the modified employment. Additionally, an employee may not earn the minimum wage if they are disabled, if they "are impaired by a physical or mental disability, including those relating to age or injury" Disabilities that can affect productivity at full capacity include "blindness, mental illness, developmental disabilities, cerebral palsy, alcoholism and drug addiction". Also, any service workers that rely on 'tips' as a substantial component of their income, can be paid as little as $2.13/ an hour, for their 'tips' will conclude the additional $5.00 sub-section.

The minimum wage in the United States is especially political. Politically, the Republican party has generally opposed increases to the minimum wage, while the progressive wing of the Democratic party, aligned with the Fight for 15 movement, has recently supported raising the federal minimum wage to $15 per hour. In 2021, the Congressional Budget Office released a report which estimated that incrementally raising the federal minimum wage to $15 an hour by 2025 would benefit 17 million workers, but would also reduce employment by 1.4 million people.

Australia 
In Australia, the Fair Work Commission (FWC) is responsible for determining and setting a national minimum wage as well as the minimum wages in awards setting wage rates for particular occupations and industries. The Fair Work Act 2009 establishes an Expert panel tasked with providing and maintaining a safety net of a fair minimum wage. The Expert panel is made up of the president of the panel, three full time commission members, and three part time commission members. All members must have experience in workplace relations, economics, social policy and/or business, industry and commerce and can inform its decision making through commissioning a range of economic and social research.

The legislative framework requires that, in setting minimum wages, the Expert Panel is required to take into account the current state of the economy, including inflation, business competitiveness, productivity and employment growth. In addition, the Expert panel must also consider the social goals of the promotion of social inclusion, the standard of living of the low paid, equal remuneration for work of equal or comparable value and reasonable wages for junior employees, employees whose jobs have training requirements and employees with disability. See Fair Work Act 2009 for more information.

The Expert panel conducts yearly wage reviews, to determine if the minimum wage needs to be adjusted based on the economy's current and projected performance. The annual minimum wage review decisions in 2016–17 found, based on research tendered and submissions to the review, that moderate increases to minimum wages do not inhibit workplace participation or result in disemployment. This position was carried over to the 2017–18 and 2018–19 decisions  and informed the decisions including the 2018–19 decision which delivered a minimum wage increase of 3% when the corresponding headline rate of inflation was 1.3%. In the annual minimum wage review decisions of 2019–20 and 2020–21, the FWC was considerably more constrained in setting minimum wages due to uncertain economic conditions during the COVID-19 pandemic and the 2020–21 decision noted the uncertainty of the impact of increases in the minimum wages for youth employment.

See also

 Average worker's wage
 Economic inequality
 Employee benefits
 Family wage
 Garcia v. San Antonio Metropolitan Transit Authority
 Labor law
 Minimum Wage Fixing Convention 1970
 Negative and positive rights
 Price controls
 Salary cap
 Scratch Beginnings
 Thomas Sowell
 Walter E. Williams
 Working poor

Notes

Further reading 
 Burkhauser, R. V. (2014). Why minimum wage increases are a poor way to help the working poor (No. 86). IZA Policy Paper, Institute for the Study of Labor (IZA).

External links

 
 Resource Guide on Minimum Wages from the International Labour Organization (a UN agency)
 The National Minimum Wage (U.K.) from official UK government website
 Find It! By Topic: Wages: Minimum Wage U.S. Department of Labor
 Characteristics of Minimum Wage Workers: 2009 U.S. Department of Labor, Bureau of Labor Statistics
 History of Changes to the Minimum Wage Law U.S. Department of Labor, Wage and Hour Division
 The Effects of a Minimum-wage Increase on Employment and Family Income Congressional Budget Office
 Inflation and the Real Minimum Wage: A Fact Sheet Congressional Research Service
 Minimum Wages in Central and Eastern Europe  Database Central Europe
 Prices and Wages – research guide at the University of Missouri libraries

Support
 Issues about Minimum Wage from the AFL–CIO
 Issue Guide on the Minimum Wage  from the Economic Policy Institute
 A $15 U.S. Minimum Wage: How the Fast-Food Industry Could Adjust Without Shedding Jobs from the Political Economy Research Institute, January 2015.

Opposed
 Reporting the Minimum Wage from The Cato Institute
 The Economic Effects of Minimum Wages from Show-Me Institute
 Economics in One Lesson: The Lesson Applied, Chapter 19: Minimum Wage Laws by Henry Hazlitt

 
Income distribution
Labour law
Labor relations
Personal taxes
Law and economics
Price controls